George Sheldon may refer to:
George Sheldon (preservationist) (1818–1916), early historic preservationist in the U.S.
George L. Sheldon (1870–1960), governor of Nebraska
George Sheldon (diver) (1874–1907), American Olympic diver
George Sheldon (tennis) (1876–?), American tennis player
George Sheldon (writer) (born 1951), American journalist and author
George Sheldon (politician) (1947–2018), American politician